Petrovsko-Razumovskaya is a railway station on the Leningradskaya line of Oktyabrskaya Railway and prospective Line D3 of the Moscow Central Diameters in Moscow. According to the current plans, the station will be rebuilt. This station will also serve as a stopping point for Moscow–Saint Petersburg high-speed railway.

Gallery

References

Railway stations in Moscow
Railway stations of Oktyabrskaya Railway
Cultural heritage monuments of regional significance in Moscow